中西區 may refer to:

Central and Western District, district in Hong Kong
West Central District, district in Tainan City